"Homewrecker" is a song co-written and recorded by American country music singer Gretchen Wilson.  It was the fourth and final single from her 2004 debut album, Here for the Party, and was released to radio in January 2005.  The song was her fourth consecutive Top Ten hit, reaching #2 on the country singles charts.  Wilson wrote this song with Rivers Rutherford and George Teren.

Content
In "Homewrecker," the female narrator addresses another female who wants to commit adultery with the narrator's lover. The narrator refers to this other woman as a "homewrecker," and threatens to "go to kickin' [her] pretty little butt.".

Critical reception
Johnny Loftus of Allmusic said that Wilson "happily belts out the harder edges" of the song, contrasting it with Wilson's vocal performance on the ballad "When I Think About Cheatin'." In Rolling Stone, Jon Caramanica also contrasted "Homewrecker" with other songs on the album, saying that its role of "moral arbiter" was "just as impassioned" as the other "country persona[s]" on the album. Stylus Magazine critic Josh Love compared the song's sound to that of the Dixie Chicks and said that it was "less about cloistered worship than a real-world application of the life-affirming principles first put forth by" the Dixie Chicks and Shania Twain. Kevin John Coyne, reviewing the song for Country Universe, gave it a negative rating. He stated that the song sounds like more of "a rip-off of than a homage to Loretta Lynn."

Chart performance
"Homewrecker" debuted on the Billboard Hot Country Songs charts dated for the week ending January 29, 2005. The song reached a peak of #2 and held that position for three weeks, spending a total of twenty weeks on the charts. It was Wilson's fourth consecutive Top Ten hit on that chart, making her the first female artist to send her first four singles into the country Top Ten since Deana Carter did so between 1996 and 1997.

Year-end charts

References

2005 singles
Gretchen Wilson songs
Songs written by Rivers Rutherford
Songs written by Gretchen Wilson
Epic Records singles
Song recordings produced by Mark Wright (record producer)
2004 songs
Songs written by George Teren